Min Hla Myat was the chief queen consort of her first cousin King Tarabya of Ava. She married Tarabya in 1385. The queen was the mother of King Min Nyo (r. 1425–26) of Ava. Her only other child Min Hla Htut was the chief wife of Gov. Minye Kyawswa II of Prome (r. 1417–22; 1442–46).

Ancestry
Her father was Gov. Thilawa of Yamethin, and through her mother Saw Pale she was a great granddaughter of King Kyawswa of Pagan.

References

Bibliography
 

Chief queens consort of Ava
14th-century Burmese women